Fake news is a type of hoax or deliberate spread of misinformation published in traditional news media or via social media.

Fake news may also refer to:

Arts and entertainment
 The Fake News Show, a British comedy panel show

Other uses 

 Fake news in the United States
 Media bias in the United States
 Fake news website, deliberate publishing on websites of hoaxes, propaganda, and disinformation purporting to be real news
 Fake news websites in the United States
 List of fake news websites

See also
 Advertorial, an advertisement in the form of editorial content
 Disinformation, intentionally false information intended to deceive the target audience
 Internet manipulation
 Lying press, a pejorative political term used largely by German political movements for the mass media
 Managing the news, acts intended to influence the presentation of information within the news media
 News propaganda, a type of propaganda covertly packaged as credible news, but without sufficient transparency concerning the source
 News satire, a type of parody presented in a format typical of mainstream journalism
 Spin (propaganda), a form of propaganda, achieved through providing a biased interpretation
 Video news release, a video segment made to look like a news report created by a PR firm, advertising agency, marketing firm, corporation, or government agency